

The Kassel 12 was a German glider used for training, developed in the 1920s. It was a minimalist design with the pilot sitting atop a tapered wooden structure that supported a high wing on a set of struts, and carried a conventional empennage at the rear. A spring skid was provided as undercarriage.

Operators

Finland
Conscripts from Lentoasema 2 built one Kassel 12A in 1935. The first flight with the aircraft was performed by Lt. Col. Ahonius at Santahamina on 28 March 1935. The aircraft was used at the Jämijärvi glider school in the summer of 1936, carrying the designation number "13". The aircraft is today on display at the Päijänne Tavastia Aviation Museum in Asikkala, near Lahti.

Specifications

References
 Royal Museum of the Armed Forces and of Military History website
 Keskinen, Niska, Stenman: Suomen museolentokoneet, Tietoteos, 1981.

1930s German sailplanes
Glider aircraft
Fieseler aircraft
Aircraft first flown in 1935
High-wing aircraft